Lubomia  is a village and the seat of Gmina Lubomia, Wodzisław County, Silesian Voivodeship, southern Poland near the Czech border. It has a population of about 3,600.

Twin towns 
  Horní Suchá (Sucha Górna)

People 
 Mariusz Pawełek, Polish footballer
 Franciszek Smuda, Polish football manager

External links 
  Official Gmina Lubomia website

Lubomia